Demodes frenata is a species of beetle in the family Cerambycidae. It was described by Francis Polkinghorne Pascoe in 1857, originally under the genus Apomecyna. It is known from Singapore, Malaysia, and Sumatra.

References

Mesosini
Beetles described in 1857